Western Wyoming Community College (Western) is a public community college in Rock Springs, Wyoming.  Western offers certificates, associate degrees, and a bachelor's degree. The college students are known as the Mustangs.

Since the local area is home to many dinosaur fossil finds, there are reproductions of various dinosaur skeletons in public areas of the college.

History
Western Wyoming Community College, the fifth of seven community colleges in Wyoming, was established in the fall of 1959. Through the efforts of a citizens’ committee, a campaign was begun, an election was held, and Western and the original district were created. In September, 1959, forty students enrolled for college credit courses with five full-time faculty teaching during the evening. Western celebrated its 60th anniversary in 2019.

From 1960–61, Western moved to Reliance,  from Rock Springs, to occupy the former Reliance High School and daytime classes began. In September, 1964, the original district was expanded to include all communities within Sweetwater County, a new Board of Trustees was elected, and the official name of the college became Western Wyoming Community College.

Consistent growth of the college led to the inauguration of a $1,822,000 building program on October 4, 1966. On November 11, 1967, ground-breaking ceremonies marked the beginning of construction on a new campus, and completion in June, 1969. Growth continued. In March, 1973, voters approved a $1,780,000 bond issue to provide additional instructional facilities. The new vocational-technical education building was ready for occupancy in fall, 1974, and the college center building was completed. In 1976, three residence halls were constructed to provide on-campus housing, made possible by a loan from the State Farm Loan Board. Western was granted accreditation by the Higher Learning Commission of the North Central Association of Colleges and Schools in April 1976.

Again, in 1981, the citizens of Sweetwater County demonstrated their support for Western by authorizing a building project that cost in excess of $63,000,000. This major expansion created one of the most modern and beautiful community college campuses in the West. The Rock Springs Daily Rocket-Miner advocated the expanded campus through the work of its late publisher, Charles E. Richardson. Students who enrolled in 1985 were the first to use new student housing, the Green River Center and the Technology and Industry shops. Between the fall of 1987 and fall of 1988, a new student commons area, classrooms and labs, offices, Children’s Center, studios, and theatre were occupied. A new chemistry laboratory was completed for the fall of 1993. Construction of a fifth residence hall was approved in December, 1994, and completed in August, 1997.  In 2022 Western received funds from the State of Wyoming and other entities to move forward with building a Health Sciences Building.

Student numbers have increased from 40 in 1959 to serving over 7,000 people per year as of 2019. These figures include all students – varying ages and interests, enrolled in the credit, non-credit and extension programs. Western has progressed from one graduate in 1962 to over 400 in 2018-2019. The commencement ceremony is held each year in May and includes Summer, Fall and Spring graduates. Over the years Western has awarded more than 9,200 associate degrees and certificates since tracking.

Location
Western Wyoming Community College is located in Rock Springs and has an extended campus center in Green River, Wyoming, along with other outreach centers across southwest Wyoming. The boundaries of the college district, with those of the county, enclose  in the southwestern part of the state. Western serves Carbon, Lincoln, Sublette, Sweetwater, and Uinta counties, covering just over 29,000 square miles. The average elevation of the main campus is over 6,500 feet above sea level. The recreation areas of Flaming Gorge National Recreation Area, The Grand Teton National Park/Jackson Hole country, and Yellowstone National Park are all easily accessible from Western.

There is a Western Wyoming Community College Foundation. Former State Senator Robert H. Johnson was one of its members.

Academics
Western offers transfer degrees for students who plan to pursue a baccalaureate, occupational degrees, and occupational certificates for students who plan to directly enter the workforce or who want to learn new skills or brush up on others.  Many of the certificates are embedded within the corresponding occupational degrees.

Museum and displays
The college features a free museum, an art gallery, and many displays that are open to visitors. The Weidner Wildlife Museum features mounted wildlife of 125 species collected worldwide. There are other natural history displays around the campus, including fossils and rock slabs from the Green River Formation, and five life sized dinosaur displays.  The Western Art Gallery, located inside the front entrance, hosts changing displays of regional, national and student art, and there are sculptures around the campus, including replica Moai statues from Easter Island.

References

External links

Education in Sweetwater County, Wyoming
Buildings and structures in Rock Springs, Wyoming
Community colleges in Wyoming
Educational institutions established in 1959
1959 establishments in Wyoming
Tourist attractions in Sweetwater County, Wyoming
NJCAA athletics